Baco may refer to:

Places
 Baco, Oriental Mindoro, a municipality in the Philippines
 Baco, Ethiopia
 Baco Airport
 Baco, Chiriquí, Panama
 Baltimore County, Maryland

Other uses
 Baco (crater), a lunar impact crater
 Baco (god), a Celtic god of the boar
 Baco noir, a grape variety
 Bacchus (Dionysus), in Portuguese and Spanish
 Baco, a former ropeway manufacturer

People with the surname
 John Baco (c. 1290 – 1346), also known as John Baconthorpe, English Carmelite friar
 Karol Bačo (born 1978), Slovak water polo player
 Peter Baco (born 1945), Slovak politician and member of the European Parliament